La Ribera de Salamanca commonly referred to as "Las Arribes" is a subcomarca in the comarca of Vitigudino in the province of Salamanca, Castile and León.  It contains seven municipalities: Aldeadávila, Masueco, Mieza, Pereña, Saucelle, Villarino de los Aires and Vilvestre.

References

Comarcas of the Province of Salamanca